Articles (arranged alphabetically) related to Mauritania include:



A 
 Adrar Region
 Adwaba
 AfricaPhonebook/Annulaires Afrique
 Akjoujt
 Aleg
 Assaba
 Atar, Mauritania
 Ayoun el Atrous

B 
 Brakna

C 
 Communications in Mauritania
 Constituencies of Mauritania

D 
 Dakhlet Nouadhibou
 Departments of Mauritania

E 
 Economy of Mauritania
 Elections in Mauritania

F 
 F'dérik

G 
 Geography of Mauritania
 Gorgol Region
 Gorgol River
 Guidimaka

H 
 Heads of government of Mauritania
 Hodh Ech Chargui
 Hodh El Gharbi

I 
 Inchiri
 Iron ore

JK 
 Kaédi
 Khoum
 Kiffa

L 
 Leblouh (fattening of girls)
 LGBT rights in Mauritania (Gay rights)
 List of cities in Mauritania
 List of companies based in Mauritania
 List of Mauritanians
 List of national parks of Mauritania

M 
 Maaouya Ould Sid'Ahmed Taya
 Mauritania
 Mauritania Railway
 Mejaouda
 Military Council for Justice and Democracy
 Military of Mauritania
 Mohamed Ali Ould Sidi Mohamed
 Mohamed Khouna Ould Haidalla
 Moktar Ould Daddah
 Moors
 Music of Mauritania

N 
 National Assembly of Mauritania
 Néma
 Nouadhibou
 Nouakchott

OPQ 
 Ouguiya
 Hmeida Ould Ahmed Taleb
 Parliament of Mauritania
 Politics of Mauritania

R 
 Railways in Mauritania
 Regions of Mauritania
 Republican Party for Democracy and Renewal
 Rosso

S 
 Sélibaby
 Senate of Mauritania
 Slavery in Mauritania

T 
 Tagant
 Tidjikdja
 Tiris Zemmour
 Transport in Mauritania
 Trarza

UVWXYZ

See also

Lists of country-related topics - similar lists for other countries

 
Mauritania